Henry Charles Goffin  (8 March 1885 – 3 March 1973) served as a Salvation Army Officer, Bandmaster, Musician and Composer in Britain and New Zealand. He was born in Plymouth, Devonshire, England, on 8 March 1885.

In the 1961 Queen's Birthday Honours, Goffin was appointed a Member of the Order of the British Empire.

References

1885 births
1973 deaths
New Zealand musicians
Musicians from Plymouth, Devon
New Zealand Salvationists
English emigrants to New Zealand
New Zealand Members of the Order of the British Empire
20th-century Methodists